Rogério Dutra Silva was the defending champion but lost in the final to Máximo González.

González won the title after defeating Dutra Silva 6–2, 7–6(7–5) in the final.

Seeds

Draw

Finals

Top half

Bottom half

References
Main Draw
Qualifying Draw

Santiago Challenger - Singles